Brie Code is an AI video game programmer, working on Assassin's Creed, Child of Light, and #SelfCare. She runs Tru Luv, a game studio which creates experimental games focused on care and characters.

Early life 
Brie grew up in the countryside outside Vancouver, British Columbia. She graduated from the University of British Columbia with a Bachelor of Science in Computer Science in 2001.

Career 
Brie worked for many years at Ubisoft Montreal, managing programming teams on games such as Assassin's Creed II. She was often the only woman on a team. She organized her co-workers to design a diversity initiative. Her award-winning downloadable faerie game Child of Light featured a female protagonist and a 25 percent female developer team.

She now runs a game studio called Tru Luv which creates experimental games focused on care and characters. In #SelfCare, a virtual bedroom is filled with calming tasks, such as reading a book, tending to a plant or sorting laundry by colour. She said "the most valuable thing a game can do for me: make me forget why I’m angry." #SelfCare was named in Apple’s Best of 2018 Trends of the Year.

References

External links 
 https://truluv.ai/
 #SelfCare

Living people
Women video game programmers
University of British Columbia alumni
Year of birth missing (living people)